Lorent Enrique Gómez Saleh (born 22 July 1988) is a Venezuelan activist. Since 2011, Saleh has participated in several activities in defense of human rights and has been repeatedly detained by the Venezuelan authorities. In 2014, he was deported from Colombia and handed over to officials of the Bolivarian Intelligence Service (SEBIN). Until 2018, he was being held in La Tumba, in Plaza Venezuela, Caracas during which time his audience had been postponed 52 times. On 12 October 2018, he was released by the Venezuelan authorities and exiled to Spain, where he arrived the next day after landing at the Madrid–Barajas Airport.

In 2017, Saleh was one of eight Venezuelans awarded with the Sakharov Prize by the European Parliament, as one of the representatives of all the political prisoners enumerated by the Foro Penal.

Activism
In 2009, Saleh, together with other young people, formed a platform to make national tours of opposition to the government of Venezuelan President Hugo Chávez. Saleh was accused the same year of the crime of "disseminating false information that causes distress" along with Gabriel Vallés, another student activist, when they were arrested with slingshots and other materials to use during the protests and with posters pointing at then-President Chávez to lying about his electoral promises.

On 2 May 2011, members of the Bolivarian National Guard fired shots at some demonstrators and evicted several youths, including Saleh, who had chained themselves to the gates of the Judicial Circuit of Barinas to demand the release of Delfín Parra Gómez, a military man who was processed. for alleged corruption in the Central Agroindustrial Azucarero Ezequiel Zamora (Caeez) and whom the youth considered a political prisoner. Saleh was severely beaten and detained, and as a result of the event, judicial proceedings were opened for the alleged crimes of resistance to authority, basic type injuries and violent outrage against a public official. His mother, Yamileth Saleh, was also imputed during the presentation hearing. At the beginning of July, Saleh was arrested by the Bolivarian Intelligence Service (SEBIN) while he was arriving at a peaceful protest on Urdaneta Avenue, in Caracas. He was released hours later. In December he is arrested again by unidentified individuals after landing at the Santo Domingo airport in Táchira.

In 2012, Saleh's NGO Operación Libertad launched an international campaign in rejection of the departure of Venezuela from the Inter-American Human Rights System. Saleh was beaten by military personnel while participating in a protest at the University of the Andes. Days later, in January 2013, when trying to travel to Costa Rica, airport authorities of Valencia, Carabobo prevented him from boarding the plane and canceled his passport. After accusations that at the end of July 2013 Saleh participated in Colombia in the launching of the Nationalist Alliance for Freedom, a political movement that defines itself as "Identitarian nationalist" in addition to "anti-Zionist", Saleh said months later in an interview with El Espectador: "I am Latin American, of Palestinian family, I can not believe in Nazi, neo-Nazi or radical positions of any kind, I am not Neo-Nazi nor do I believe in militarist governments."

In February 2014, Saleh began an international campaign to denounce human rights violations during the 2014 Venezuelan protests. In Costa Rica he got the attention of the Congress, members of the Church and important figures of the country. On February 19, seven days after the start of the protests, the death of three people in Caracas and the handing over of Leopoldo López to the Venezuelan authorities, Saleh traveled again to Colombia. On 2 May, Venezuelan Interior Minister Miguel Rodríguez Torres claimed that Henrique Salas Römer financed the JAVU group and read a supposed document with confidential information dated 2011, about supposed "training camps" held in Carabobo by the group on a farm property of Venezuelan opposition deputy Freddy Curupe, in which Saleh is mentioned.

Deportation and detention at La Tumba
On 4 September, Saleh notified several friends that there was a suspicious car circulating around his residence in Bogotá. Hours later he was arrested in an operation that the Migration Office of Colombia justified in a decree that signals the deportation of foreigners when they represent a threat to national security or if they are requested by the authorities of other countries. The same day was handed over to SEBIN officials in San Cristóbal and the Migration Office of San Antonio del Táchira. Upon arriving in Venezuela, Saleh was accused of three other crimes for having falsified, while working for the Venezuelan immigration service, identity documents for Colombian citizens to participate in violent demonstrations in Venezuela. His family and his lawyer stated that Saleh has never worked for the immigration service or for any other Venezuelan government office. In several television interventions, pro-government leaders accused Saleh of having links with Colombian paramilitaries and former Colombian President Álvaro Uribe, and of planning coup and terrorist activities in Venezuela, but these accusations are not included in his court file.

On 2 March 2015, the Inter-American Commission on Human Rights (IACHR) issued precautionary measures of protection in resolution 6/2015 in favor of Lorent Saleh and Gerardo Carrero in response to the request made on 8 July 2013 by Tamara Sujú on behalf of the Foro Penal (Criminal Forum), in which he asked the agency to require the Venezuelan government to protect the life and personal integrity of Saleh and, later in the proceedings, also the protection of Carrero for the alleged violation of his human rights. The IACHR document notes that Saleh and Guerrero "would be located in a basement (five floors below ground), known as La Tumba ("The Tomb"), of the building that serves as the main headquarters of the SEBIN, where they are subjected to "prolonged isolation without contact with other people, in a confined space of 2 × 3 meters, with video cameras and microphones in each of their cells, without access to sunlight or outdoors," and the two prisoners have reported suffering from "nervous breakdowns, stomach problems, diarrhea, vomiting, spasms, joint pains, headaches, dermatitis, panic attacks, muscle disorders and temporary disorientation" without "presumably receiving adequate medical attention." The Commission considered that the students "are in a situation of seriousness and urgency, since their lives and personal integrity would be at risk", and in accordance with Article 25 of the IACHR's Rules of Procedure, the agency asked the Venezuelan government to adopt the measures necessary to preserve the life and personal integrity of detainees, in particular to provide adequate medical care in accordance with the conditions of their pathologies, and to ensure that their detention conditions are in accordance with international standards, taking into consideration their current health status. On 20 April 2015, Lorent tried to commit suicide in his cell, which was stopped by SEBIN officials. His lawyer denounced that by then he had not received a response from the Public Ministry about the request for psychiatric evaluations of Saleh and Gabriel Valles.

In 2017, Saleh was one of eight Venezuelans awarded with the Sakharov Prize by the European Parliament, one of the representatives being all political prisoners enumerated by the Foro Penal. In November, after the deferment of the preliminary hearing of Lorent 42 times, his relatives requested his immediate release to the Attorney General appointed by the Constituent National Assembly, Tarek William Saab, explaining that if a trial is not initiated two years after the arrest, the accused must be released immediately. On 4 September 2018, his hearing had been deferred 52 times. By 4 September 2018, his hearing had been deferred 52 times.

On 12 October 2018, Saleh was released, under the figure of exile (despite being a figure that does not exist in the laws of the Bolivarian Republic of Venezuela), supposedly to prevent him from committing suicide. He arrived at the Madrid–Barajas Airport on 13 October at 10:15 in the morning.

References

1988 births
Living people
People from San Cristóbal, Táchira
Prisoners and detainees of Venezuela
Venezuelan democracy activists
Venezuelan human rights activists
Venezuelan prisoners and detainees
Venezuelan dissidents
People extradited to Venezuela
Venezuelan exiles
People of the Crisis in Venezuela
Venezuelan torture victims
Movimiento Estudiantil (Venezuela)